Nazarabad (also Romanized as Naẓarābād) is a village in Takab Rural District, in the Central District of Dargaz County, Razavi Khorasan Province, Iran. At the 2006 census, its population was 24, in 7 families.

References 

Populated places in Dargaz County